Carlos García (born 18 September 1964) is a Uruguayan former cyclist. He competed in the individual pursuit and points race events at the 1984 Summer Olympics.

References

External links
 

1964 births
Living people
Uruguayan male cyclists
Olympic cyclists of Uruguay
Cyclists at the 1984 Summer Olympics
Place of birth missing (living people)